Tabernacle Christian School is a private Christian School in Gardendale, Alabama, United States, serving grades K3-12.  The current principal is Vance McBrayer, who came to TCS in July 2016.

TCS was founded by Dr. Ronald Dabbs, former Pastor of Gardendale Baptist Tabernacle (GBT) in 1974.  Since its inception, Tabernacle has been the largest private school in north Jefferson County and one of the largest Christian schools in Birmingham metropolitan area.

Tabernacle was one of the driving forces behind the creation of the Alabama Christian Education Association (ACEA), the largest Christian school association in Alabama, in 1975.  Former Tabernacle Principal Robin Mears currently serves as Executive Director of the ACEA.

Academics

Tabernacle became ineligible for Alabama state assistance when it failed to achieve accreditation in accord with state standards.

Tabernacle Christian uses the A Beka Book and Bob Jones University curricula. TCS hosts the ACEA State Academic Competition in January of each year.

Athletics

The Torches field teams in football, baseball, softball, volleyball, cheerleading, men's and women's basketball, track and field, and Archery.  TCS eight-man football competes in the Christian Football Association (CFA) and in the Alabama Christian Education Athletic Association (ACEAA) in all other sports.

The Torches have appeared in the CFA state title game four times, hosting the championship game in 2000. Until 2003, the Torches football program had advanced to the post-season playoffs each year since the program's inception. The Torches have won two CFA state titles. In 2007, the Torches won their first, beating Tuscaloosa Christian 58-12. The second came in 2011 when the Torches beat North River Christian Academy 52-22. This win completed the first ever perfect season for the Torches ending with an 11-0 record.

TCS Men's Basketball has advanced to the ACEAA final four more times than any school in the state, including winning the NACA National Championship in 1982, and ACEAA state championship in 1980, 1981, 1982, and 1991. During the 2007-2008 season, the Men's Basketball Varsity team had a phenomenal season. The Torches went on to not only win their prized "Torch Classic" Tournament, but also clinch the 2008 ACEAA State Championship under the leadership of Head Coach David Corbett. In 2006 the Lady Torches broke a three-year championship-game losing streak to bring home the school's first ever girls' state basketball title. In volleyball, the Torches won the state championships at the varsity and junior varsity levels in 2004, 2005 and 2006, finishing the season unbeaten in 2005. In 2003, 2008, 2012,& 2015 Tabernacle's varsity and Junior varsity cheerleading squads placed first in the state and also captured the ACEAA spirit award; no other school has taken home the three awards in the same year.

In addition to competing against ACEAA teams, the Torches' men and women basketball squads travel to face off against schools in Minnesota, Georgia, Florida, Texas, Oklahoma, Tennessee, Mississippi, South Carolina, and Illinois each season.  In 2006, the Lady Torches broke a three-year championship game losing streak to win the school's first ever girls' state basketball title. In volleyball, the Torches won the state championships at the varsity and junior varsity levels in 2004, 2005 and 2006, finishing the season unbeaten in 2005. In 2003, Tabernacle's varsity and junior varsity cheerleading squads placed first in the state and also captured the ACEAA spirit award; no other school has taken home the three awards in the same year.

References

External links
 Tabernacle Christian School official site
 Tabernacle Christian School Athletics Heat Index
 Alabama Christian Education Association 
 Christian Football Association

1974 establishments in Alabama
Christian schools in Alabama
Private elementary schools in Alabama
Private middle schools in Alabama
Private high schools in Alabama
Educational institutions established in 1974
Schools in Jefferson County, Alabama